The 2007–08 Colorado Avalanche season began on October 3, 2007, and ended on May 3, 2008. It was the franchise's 36th season, 29th in the National Hockey League, and 13th as the Colorado Avalanche.

Regular season

The Avalanche were the most disciplined team during the regular season, with only 301 power-play opportunities against. They also scored the fewest shorthanded goals of all 30 teams, with 2.

Divisional standings

Conference standings

Schedule and results

|- align="center" bgcolor="#bbffbb"
| 1 || September 17 || Colorado || 4 – 3  || Phoenix || OT || Weiman  || 8,392 || 1–0
|- align="center" bgcolor="#bbffbb"
| 2 || September 19 || Los Angeles || 3 – 6 || Colorado ||  || Budaj ||  || 2–0
|- align="center" bgcolor="#bbffbb"
| 3 || September 20 || Colorado || 6 – 3  || Dallas ||  || Wall  || 14,895  || 3–0
|- align="center" bgcolor="#ffbbbb"
| 4 || September 22 || Colorado || 2 – 3  || Los Angeles† || SO  || Weiman  ||   || 3–1
|- align="center" bgcolor="#ffbbbb"
| 5 || September 25 || Dallas || 5 – 4  || Colorado || OT  || Budaj  ||  || 3–2
|- align="center" bgcolor="#bbffbb"
| 6 || September 29 || Phoenix || 2 – 3  || Colorado ||  || Budaj  ||  || 4–2
|-
| colspan=9 | † In Las Vegas
|-

|- align="center" bgcolor="#bbffbb"
| 1 || October 3 || Dallas || 3 – 4  || Colorado ||  || Budaj  || 17,487  || 1–0–0 || 2
|- align="center" bgcolor="#ffbbbb"
| 2 || October 4 || Colorado || 0 – 4  || Nashville ||  || Budaj  || 16,363 || 1–1–0  || 2
|- align="center" bgcolor="#bbffbb"
| 3 || October 7 || San Jose || 2 – 6  || Colorado ||  || Budaj  || 15,876  || 2–1–0  || 4
|- align="center" bgcolor="#ffbbbb"
| 4 || October 12 || Colorado || 1 – 4  || St. Louis ||  || Theodore  || 19,150  || 2–2–0  || 4
|- align="center" bgcolor="#bbffbb"
| 5 || October 13 || Columbus || 1 – 5  || Colorado ||  || Budaj  || 16,153  || 3–2–0  || 6
|- align="center" bgcolor="#bbffbb"
| 6 || October 16 || Calgary || 4 – 5  || Colorado || SO  || Theodore  || 16,722  || 4–2–0  || 8
|- align="center" bgcolor="#ffbbbb"
| 7 || October 19 || Colorado || 3 – 5 || Chicago ||  || Theodore || 13,519 || 4–3–0 || 8
|- align="center" bgcolor="#ffbbbb"
| 8 || October 21 || Colorado || 2 – 3 || Minnesota ||  || Budaj || 18,568 || 4–4–0 || 8
|- align="center" bgcolor="#bbffbb"
| 9 || October 23 || Colorado || 4 – 2 || Edmonton ||  || Budaj || 16,839 || 5–4–0 || 10
|- align="center" bgcolor="#bbffbb"
| 10 || October 26 || Colorado || 3 – 2 || Calgary || OT || Theodore  || 19,289 || 6–4–0  || 12
|- align="center" bgcolor="#bbffbb"
| 11 || October 28 || Minnesota || 1 – 3 || Colorado ||  || Budaj || 17,041 ||   7–4–0 || 14
|-

|- align="center" bgcolor="#bbffbb"
| 12 || November 1 || Pittsburgh || 2 – 3 || Colorado ||  || Theodore || 18,007 || 8–4–0 || 16
|- align="center" bgcolor="#ffbbbb"
| 13 || November 3 || Vancouver || 4 – 3  || Colorado ||  || Budaj  || 18,007  || 8–5–0  || 16
|- align="center" bgcolor="#bbffbb"
| 14 || November 5 || Calgary || 1 – 4  || Colorado ||  || Theodore  || 15,655 || 9–5–0 || 18
|- align="center" bgcolor="#bbffbb"
| 15 || November 7 || Edmonton || 3 – 4 || Colorado || SO || Budaj || 15,877 || 10–5–0 || 20
|- align="center"
| 16 || November 9 || Colorado || 1 – 2  || Vancouver || OT  || Theodore  || 18,630  || 10–5–1  || 21
|- align="center" bgcolor="#bbffbb"
| 17 || November 11 || Minnesota || 2 – 4  || Colorado ||  || Budaj  || 15,434  || 11–5–1  || 23
|- align="center" bgcolor="#ffbbbb"
| 18 || November 16 || Colorado || 1 – 6  || Dallas ||  || Theodore  || 18,019  || 11–6–1  || 23
|- align="center" bgcolor="#ffbbbb"
| 19 || November 18 || Colorado || 1 – 4  || Minnesota ||  || Budaj  || 18,568  || 11–7–1  || 23
|- align="center" bgcolor="#ffbbbb"
| 20 || November 20 || Colorado || 1 – 4  || Calgary ||  || Theodore  || 19,289  || 11–8–1  || 23
|- align="center" bgcolor="#bbffbb"
| 21 || November 22 || Colorado || 3 – 2  || Edmonton ||  || Budaj  || 16,839  || 12–8–1  || 25
|- align="center" bgcolor="#ffbbbb"
| 22 || November 24 || Calgary || 5 – 2  || Colorado ||  || Theodore  || 18,007  || 12–9–1  || 25
|- align="center" bgcolor="#bbffbb"
| 23 || November 28 || Edmonton || 2 – 4  || Colorado ||  || Budaj  || 15,128  || 13–9–1  || 27
|- align="center" bgcolor="#ffbbbb"
| 24 || November 30 || Colorado || 2 – 3  || San Jose ||  || Budaj  || 17,496  || 13–10–1  || 27
|-

|- align="center" bgcolor="#bbffbb"
| 25 || December 1 || Colorado || 5 – 2  || Los Angeles ||  || Theodore  || 17,297  || 14–10–1  || 29
|- align="center" bgcolor="#ffbbbb"
| 26 || December 3 || San Jose || 3 – 2  || Colorado ||  || Theodore  || 15,213  || 14–11–1  || 29
|- align="center" bgcolor="#ffbbbb"
| 27 || December 5 || Colorado || 4 – 5  || Columbus ||  || Budaj  || 12,851  || 14–12–1  || 29
|- align="center" bgcolor="#bbffbb"
| 28 || December 7 || Philadelphia || 1 – 2  || Colorado ||  || Theodore  || 16,312  || 15–12–1  || 31
|- align="center" bgcolor="#bbffbb"
| 29 || December 9 || St. Louis || 5 – 9  || Colorado ||  || Theodore  || 15,476  || 16–12–1  || 33
|- align="center" bgcolor="#ffbbbb"
| 30 || December 12 || Colorado || 1 – 4  || Columbus ||  || Theodore  || 13,150  || 16–13–1  || 33
|- align="center" bgcolor="#bbffbb"
| 31 || December 13 || Colorado || 2 – 1  || Nashville ||  || Budaj  || 12,456  || 17–13–1  || 35
|- align="center" bgcolor="#bbffbb"
| 32 || December 15 || Nashville || 1 – 3  || Colorado ||  || Budaj  || 16,582  || 18–13–1  || 37
|- align="center" bgcolor="#bbffbb"
| 33 || December 17 || Colorado || 4 – 2  || Los Angeles ||  || Budaj  || 16,647  || 19–13–1  || 39
|- align="center"
| 34 || December 19 || Colorado || 1 – 2  || Anaheim || OT  || Budaj  || 17,197  || 19–13–2  || 40
|- align="center" bgcolor="#bbffbb"
| 35 || December 21 || NY Rangers || 3 – 4  || Colorado || OT || Budaj  || 16,612  || 20–13–2  || 42
|- align="center" bgcolor="#bbffbb"
| 36 || December 23 || Vancouver || 1 – 3  || Colorado ||  || Budaj  || 17,186  || 21–13–2  || 44
|- align="center" bgcolor="#ffbbbb"
| 37 || December 27 || Detroit || 4 – 2 || Colorado ||  || Budaj || 18,007 || 21–14–2 || 44
|- align="center" bgcolor="#ffbbbb"
| 38 || December 29 || Los Angeles || 3 – 1 || Colorado ||  || Theodore || 17,256 || 21–15–2 || 44
|- align="center"
| 39 || December 31 || Colorado || 3 – 4 || Phoenix || SO || Budaj || 12,973 || 21–15–3 || 45
|-

|- align="center" bgcolor="#ffbbbb"
| 40 || January 2 || Phoenix || 5 – 2 || Colorado ||  || Budaj || 15,232 || 21–16–3 || 45
|- align="center" bgcolor="#bbffbb"
| 41 || January 5 || NY Islanders || 1 – 2  || Colorado || OT  || Theodore  || 17,154  || 22–16–3  || 47
|- align="center" bgcolor="#ffbbbb"
| 42 || January 8 || Colorado || 0 – 1  || Detroit ||  || Theodore  || 19,160  || 22–17–3  || 47
|- align="center" bgcolor="#ffbbbb"
| 43 || January 9 || Colorado || 1 – 2 || Washington ||  || Theodore || 16,168 || 22–18–3 ||  47
|- align="center" bgcolor="#bbffbb"
| 44 || January 12 || Colorado || 5 – 4 || Carolina ||  || Theodore || 18,680 || 23–18–3 || 49
|- align="center" bgcolor="#bbffbb"
| 45 || January 13 || Colorado || 4 – 3  || Florida || SO  || Theodore  || 13,854  || 24–18–3  || 51
|- align="center" bgcolor="#bbffbb"
| 46 || January 15 || Colorado || 3 – 0  || Tampa Bay ||  || Theodore  || 17,222  || 25–18–3  || 53
|- align="center"
| 47 || January 18 || Chicago || 2 – 1 || Colorado || SO || Theodore || 18,007 || 25–18–4 || 54
|- align="center" bgcolor="bbffbb"
| 48 || January 20 || Columbus || 1 – 3  || Colorado ||  || Theodore  || 17,197  || 26–18–4  || 56
|- align="center" bgcolor="#ffbbbb"
| 49 || January 22 || Nashville || 4 – 0  || Colorado ||  || Theodore  || 15,235  || 26–19–4  || 56
|- align="center" bgcolor="#ffbbbb"
| 50 || January 24 || Minnesota || 3 – 2  || Colorado ||  || Theodore  || 15,321  || 26–20–4  || 56
|- align="center" bgcolor="#bbffbb"
| 51 || January 30 || Chicago || 3 – 6  || Colorado ||  || Theodore  || 15,348  || 27–20–4  || 58
|-

|- align="center" bgcolor="#ffbbbb"
| 52 || February 1 || Colorado ||0 – 2  || Detroit ||  || Budaj  || 20,066  || 27–21–4  || 58
|- align="center" bgcolor="#bbffbb"
| 53 || February 2 || Colorado || 6 – 4  || St. Louis ||  || Budaj  || 19,150  || 28–21–4  || 60
|- align="center"
| 55 || February 4 || Phoenix || 4 – 3  || Colorado || OT  || Budaj  ||   14,381 || 28–21–5  || 61
|- align="center" bgcolor="#bbffbb"
| 55 || February 6 || Colorado || 3 – 1  || San Jose ||  || Theodore  || 17,087  || 29–21–5  || 63
|- align="center" bgcolor="#bbffbb"
| 56 || February 9 || Colorado || 6 – 2  || Vancouver ||  || Theodore  || 18,630  || 30–21–5  || 65
|- align="center" bgcolor="#ffbbbb"
| 57 || February 12 || Anaheim || 2 – 1  || Colorado ||  || Theodore  || 16,257  || 30–22–5  || 65
|- align="center" bgcolor="#ffbbbb"
| 58 || February 14 || St. Louis || 4 – 1  || Colorado ||  || Theodore  || 17,131  || 30–23–5  || 65
|- align="center" bgcolor="#ffbbbb"
| 59 || February 17 || Colorado || 1 – 2  || Chicago ||  || Theodore  || 21,715  || 30–24–5  || 65
|- align="center" bgcolor="#ffbbbb"
| 60 || February 18 || Detroit || 4 – 0  || Colorado ||  || Theodore  || 18,007  || 30–25–5  || 65
|- align="center"
| 61 || February 20 || Colorado || 2 – 3  || Anaheim || SO  || Budaj  || 17,174  || 30–25–6  || 66
|- align="center" bgcolor="#bbffbb"
| 62 || February 22 || Colorado || 3 – 2  || Phoenix || SO  || Theodore  || 15,882  || 31–25–6  || 68
|- align="center" bgcolor="#ffbbbb"
| 63 || February 24 || Colorado || 2 – 3  || Edmonton ||  || Theodore  || 16,839  || 31–26–6  || 68
|- align="center" bgcolor="#bbffbb"
| 64 || February 26 || Colorado || 3 – 2  || Calgary || OT  || Theodore  || 19,289  || 32–26–6  || 70
|- align="center" bgcolor="#bbffbb"
| 65 || February 27 || Colorado || 3 – 2  || Vancouver || SO  || Theodore  || 18,630  || 33–26–6  || 72
|-

|- align="center" bgcolor="#bbffbb"
| 66 || March 1 || Los Angeles || 2 – 5  || Colorado ||  || Theodore  || 18,007  || 34–26–6  || 74
|- align="center" bgcolor="#bbffbb"
| 67 || March 4 || Vancouver || 1 – 2  || Colorado ||  || Theodore  || 17,621  || 35–26–6  || 76
|- align="center" bgcolor="#bbffbb"
| 68 || March 6 || Anaheim || 0 – 1  || Colorado ||  || Theodore  || 18,007  || 36–26–6  || 78
|- align="center" bgcolor="#bbffbb"
| 69 || March 8 || Dallas || 1 – 3  || Colorado ||  || Theodore  || 18,007  || 37–26–6  || 80
|- align="center" bgcolor="#ffbbbb"
| 70 || March 9 || Colorado || 0 – 3  || Dallas ||  || Theodore  || 18,532  || 37–27–6  || 80
|- align="center" bgcolor="#bbffbb"
| 71 || March 11 || Colorado || 5 – 2  || Atlanta ||  || Theodore  || 14,089  || 38–27–6  || 82
|- align="center" bgcolor="#bbffbb"
| 72 || March 13 || Edmonton || 1 – 5  || Colorado ||  || Budaj  || 18,007  || 39–27–6  || 84
|- align="center" bgcolor="#ffbbbb"
| 73 || March 15 || New Jersey || 4 – 2  || Colorado ||  || Theodore  || 18,007  || 39–28–6  || 84
|- align="center" bgcolor="#ffbbbb"
| 74 || March 17 || Colorado || 1 – 3  || Minnesota ||  || Theodore  || 18,568  || 39–29–6  || 84
|- align="center" bgcolor="#ffbbbb"
| 75 || March 20 || Colorado || 1 – 2  || Calgary ||  || Theodore  || 19,289  || 39–30–6  || 84
|- align="center" bgcolor="ffbbbb"
| 76 || March 22 || Colorado || 5 – 7 || Edmonton ||  || Budaj || 16,839 || 39–31–6 || 84
|- align="center" bgcolor="#bbffbb"
| 77 || March 24 || Calgary || 0 – 2  || Colorado ||  || Theodore  || 18,007  || 40–31–6  || 86
|- align="center" bgcolor="#bbffbb"
| 78 || March 26 || Vancouver || 3 – 6  || Colorado ||  || Theodore  || 17,728  || 41–31–6  || 88
|- align="center" bgcolor="#bbffbb"
| 79 || March 28 || Edmonton || 4 – 5  || Colorado || SO  || Theodore  || 17,846  || 42–31–6  || 90
|- align="center"
| 80 || March 30 || Colorado || 2 – 3  || Minnesota || OT  || Theodore  || 18,568  || 42–31–7  || 91
|-

|- align="center" bgcolor="#bbffbb"
| 81 || April 1 || Colorado || 4 – 2  || Vancouver ||  || Theodore  || 18,630 || 43–31–7  || 93
|- align="center" bgcolor="#bbffbb"
| 82 || April 6 || Minnesota || 3 – 4  || Colorado || SO  || Theodore  || 18,007  || 44–31–7  || 95
|-

Playoffs
The Avalanche clinched the sixth seed in the Western Conference playoffs after missing the playoffs last season for the first time since relocating to Denver in 1995.

|- align="center" bgcolor="#bbffbb"
| 1 || April 9 || Colorado || 3 – 2  || Minnesota || 1OT || Theodore || 19,352 || 1–0
|- align="center" bgcolor="#ffbbbb"
| 2 || April 11 || Colorado || 2 – 3 || Minnesota || 1OT || Theodore || 19,360 || 1–1
|- align="center" bgcolor="#ffbbbb"
| 3 || April 14 || Minnesota || 3 – 2 || Colorado || 1OT || Theodore || 18,007 || 1–2
|- align="center" bgcolor="#bbffbb"
| 4 || April 15 || Minnesota || 1 – 5 || Colorado || || Theodore || 18,007 || 2–2
|- align="center" bgcolor="#bbffbb"
| 5 || April 17 || Colorado || 3 – 2 || Minnesota || || Theodore || 19,364 || 3–2
|- align="center" bgcolor="#bbffbb"
| 6 || April 19 || Minnesota || 1 – 2 || Colorado || || Theodore || 18,007 || 4–2
|-

|- align="center" bgcolor="#ffbbbb"
| 1 || April 24 || Colorado || 3 – 4 || Detroit || || Theodore || 20,066 || 0–1
|- align="center" bgcolor="#ffbbbb"
| 2 || April 26 || Colorado || 1 – 5 || Detroit || || Theodore || 20,066 || 0–2
|- align="center" bgcolor="#ffbbbb"
| 3 || April 29 || Detroit || 4 – 3  || Colorado ||  || Theodore || 18,007 || 0–3
|- align="center" bgcolor="#ffbbbb"
| 4 || May 1 || Detroit || 8 - 2 || Colorado || || Theodore || 18,007 || 0-4
|-

Player statistics

Skaters
Note: GP = Games played; G = Goals; A = Assists; Pts = Points; PIM = Penalty minutes

Goaltenders
Note: GP = Games played; TOI = Time on ice (minutes); W = Wins; L = Losses; OT = Overtime/shootout losses; GA = Goals against; SO = Shutouts; SV% = Save percentage; GAA = Goals against average

Records and milestones

Records

Milestones
On October 7, Joe Sakic scored twice to move past Phil Esposito into 8th place all-time in scoring.
 On October 26, Joel Quenneville won his 400th game as a head coach, to move him into 7th place on the all-time list. Joe Sakic also picked up his 1,600th career point by providing the primary assist to Ryan Smyth's OT winner against the Flames, and Andrew Brunette picked up his 500th career point with a secondary assist to Joe Sakic's goal that put the Avs up 1–0 in the first period.
With a 4–2 win over the Edmonton Oilers at the Pepsi Center on November 28, the Avalanche won their 500th regular season game since their move from Quebec in 1995.
With a 9–5 win over St. Louis on December 9, the Avalanche reached 1,000 wins in their franchise history.
In a game against the Edmonton Oilers on March 22, Joe Sakic assisted on a Tyler Arnason goal for his 1,000th career assist, becoming just the 11th player in NHL history to reach 1,000 assists.

Transactions
The Avalanche were involved in the following transactions during the season:

Trades

Free agents

Draft picks
Colorado had nine picks at the 2007 NHL Entry Draft in Columbus, Ohio.  The Avalanche picked 14th overall.

Farm teams

Lake Erie Monsters
The Avalanche had a new American Hockey League affiliate in the Lake Erie Monsters, based in Cleveland, Ohio.  The team is a revival of the Utah Grizzlies franchise that had been dormant since 2005.

Johnstown Chiefs
The Johnstown Chiefs of the ECHL were the Avalanche's second-tier affiliate.

See also
2006–07 NHL season
2007–08 NHL season

References

Player stats: Colorado Avalanche player stats on espn.com
Game log: Colorado Avalanche game log on espn.com
Team standings: NHL standings on espn.com

Colorado Avalanche seasons
Colorado Avalanche season, 2007-08
Colorado Avalanche
Colorado Avalanche